Opogona purpuriella is a moth of the family Tineidae. It was first described by Otto Swezey in 1913. It has been recorded from Hawaii and Tonga. It has also been reported as a port interception in California.

The wingspan is about 10 mm. The forewings are largely metallic purple and violet with three pale yellowish patches, of which the largest one is on the inner or hind margin so that when the insect is at rest with the wings closed, this patch is brought alongside the one on the opposing wing and together they form a conspicuous mark in the middle of the back.

The larvae are scavengers and have been reared from dead sugarcane, dead bark of Artocarpus and other decaying vegetable matter, Plumeria, Reynoldsia and Sicana odorifera.

External links

Opogona
Moths described in 1913